Newcastle were a rugby league team who played in the New South Wales Rugby Football League premiership from 1908–1909, one of the nine foundation clubs. After the formation of several clubs in January 1908, members of the NSWRFL came to Newcastle to hold talks with the local footballing community at a meeting on 8 February 1908. However, at this meeting the motion to have a public meeting was lost. The local rugby union fraternity threatened sanctions and further recruitment occurred in secret. Finally a band of Rebel Pioneers assembled and signed up on 10 April, just days before the start of the competition.

Sometimes called the Rebels, Newcastle played in a strip of red and white hoops. They boasted the likes of dual-code international Pat Walsh in their side. Their moment of glory came in the latter weeks of 1909 when they beat league leaders South Sydney 7–6 on 7 August in front of 3,000 spectators at the Newcastle Showground. It was Souths' only loss for the season. This had come three days after beating a New Zealand Maori team.

Newcastle finished fourth and made the semis but were beaten by Souths 20–0.

The following year, the team left the NSWRL as a local Newcastle Rugby League competition was established and many players joined the four Newcastle foundation clubs. They were replaced by Annandale in the NSWRL.

Since 1988, a new team, the Newcastle Knights has again represented the Newcastle district in the NSWRL and its successors.

In 2008 the Newcastle Knights wore a special replica red and white hooped jersey to celebrate the region's rugby league heritage for the NRL's heritage round.

The modern day Newcastle Rugby League competition operates a representative side named the Newcastle Rebels, in honour of the original team created in 1908. In 2023, this team will compete in the Men's Country Championships in the Northern Pool.

1908
Stan Carpenter was the original captain of the club [Ted McGuinness, Vice Captain] who played their first match against Glebe, losing 8–5. This was then followed by a bye in the second round of the premiership and then securing their first victory in the next round by beating Cumberland 37–0. A win against Western Suburbs was followed by a loss against North Sydney in round five.

Arguably the most significant event of the season for the club was in round six when they were scheduled to play against Newtown in the only match of the weekend. This fact meant that a crowd of 14,000, the second largest in the season, showed up to watch the two teams play at the Royal Agricultural Society Grounds. In this match Newcastle were able to win 17–8.

The club had a tough draw at the end of the season and won just one of their remaining four games. All three of the losses were against the eventual finalists - two against the eventual premiers South Sydney and the other against the runners-up, Eastern Suburbs.

A full list of their inaugural squad can be found at rugbyleagueproject:

1909

2023

The modern day Newcastle Rebels  will compete in the 2023 Men's Country Championships. 
Their first match of the tournament was against a Central Coast representative side. Their match day lineup has been named as: 1. Cameron Anderson Central Charlestown Butcher Boys, 2. James Bradley Maitland Pickers, 3. Gary Anderson Maitland Pickers 4. Timanu Alexander Northern Hawks 5. Joe Woodbury Macquarie Scorpions 6. Chad O'Donnell (C) Maitland Pickers, 7. Dylan Phythian Lakes United, 8. Jayden Butterfield Maitland Pickers, 9. Luke Huth Cessnock Goannas, 10. James Taylor Maitland Pickers, 11. Lewis Hamilton South Newcastle Lions, 12. Wyatt Shaw Cessnock Goannas, 13. Ben Stone Western Suburbs Rosellas, 14. Sam Clune Cessnock Goannas 15. Luke Higgins Macquarie Scorpions, 17. Connor Kirkwood Macquarie Scorpions, 18. Lincoln Smith Maitland Pickers, 19. Mitchell Black South Newcastle Lions and 20. Lachlan O'Brien Central Charlestown Butcher Boys. After winning 36-14 , they progressed to play Illawarra Dragons, who they defeated 30-10 .

Representatives players

Australia
 Pat Walsh (1908)

New South Wales
 Pat Walsh (1908)
 Ted McGuinness (1910)

References

External links
RL1908's Newcastle page

Rugby clubs established in 1908
1908 establishments in Australia
Defunct rugby league teams in Australia
Defunct NSWRL/ARL/SL/NRL clubs
Rugby league teams in Newcastle, New South Wales